Lacus Lenitatis (Latin lēnitātis, for "Lake of Softness") is a small lunar mare in the Terra Nivium region on the Moon. It is located at 14.3° N, 12.1° E and is 78 km in diameter.

References

External links

Lacus Lenitatis at The Moon Wiki

Lenitatis